Vinther (also spelled Winther) is a common Anglo-Germanic surname dating back to the 13th century. The name developed from the Anglo-French word Vintner, meaning someone who is involved with winemaking. The surname is used worldwide, but is mainly found in Europe and the United States.

Etymology

History
The surname Vinther dates back to 1221 England and derives from the Anglo-French word Vintner, meaning a person engaged in winemaking. It was an occupational name for wine sellers during the 13th century. In Denmark and Norway, it was originally given to people considered to possess a frosty or gloomy temperament, the corresponding Old English and Old High German words being Winter and Wintar. In Central, South and Eastern Europe the surname had changed to Vinter by leaving letter H from the word.

Usage
Vinther is the 92,287th most common surname in the world. It is most prevalent in Denmark and the highest density is in the Faroe Islands. Nowadays, it is most popular in Europe and the United States.

Notable people with the surname

See also
 Nielsen & Winther Type AA
 Winther (automobile)

References

Sources

Printed

Online

External links
 Vinther at Geni.com
 Vinther at Ancestry.com